Lakeside Park is a   Local Nature Reserve west of Guildford in Surrey. It is owned and managed by Guildford Borough Council.

The Blackwater River runs through this wetland site, which also has ponds, lakes, reed beds, an orchid meadow and wet woodland. Flora include water violet, bee orchid and ragged robin. There are bats, common blue butterflies and hairy dragonflies.

There is access from Lakeside Road in Ash.

References

Local Nature Reserves in Surrey